Thomas Edmund Mooney (January 21, 1906 – September 14, 1944)  was a Canadian chaplain who served in World War II. Mooney was the first Canadian Catholic Chaplain reported killed in action during World War II. Mooney served as Director of Music at  St. Mary's Roman Catholic Cathedral in Islington, Ontario.

History 

Mooney was born in Westport, Ontario on January 21, 1906, to parents Michael Edmund and Anna Cecelia Mooney.  Mooney's father, grandfather and great-grandfather were lockmasters at the Rideau Canal.   Mooney's Bay Park was named after the Mooney family of lockmasters.

After graduating from high school, Mooney entered St. Michael's College, University of Toronto. He was a member of the Oratorical Club, the Quindecim Club, and the Literary Society.  He was also a member of the Intercollegiate Boxing, Wrestling, and Fencing Team, winning letters for wrestling in the 158-pound class.

While at St. Michael's he decided to enter the priesthood. He attended St. Augustine's Seminary and was ordained in the Cathedral of the Immaculate Conception, Kingston on May 21, 1932.  He served as Curate and Director of the Choir until January 10, 1942, when he became a Canadian Chaplain.

On September 14, 1944, the chaplain was killed in action at Moerkerke.

References

External links 
The Observer, "Killed in Action" (http://obs.stparchive.com/Archive/OBS/OBS10291944p01.php)

http://www.waymarking.com/waymarks/WMB8DT_Newboro_War_Memorial_Newboro_Ontario

Roman Catholic clergy in Canada
World War II chaplains
1906 births
1944 deaths
Canadian Army personnel of World War II
Canadian military personnel killed in World War II
Canadian military chaplains
Deaths by explosive device
Deaths by firearm in Belgium